Aloomba is a town and a locality in the Cairns Region, Queensland, Australia.

Geography

Aloomba is a long thin locality hemmed in east and west by mountain ranges. It is bounded to the north by the Mulgrave River which then passes through the west of the locality. The North Coast railway line enters the locality from the south immediately to the west of the highway but then veers to the east in order to pass through the town, after which the railway veers back towards the highway but does not rejoin it within the locality.

The mountainous western part of the locality is within the Malbon Thompson Forest Reserve. The remainder is relatively flat freehold land used predominantly for farming, particularly growing sugarcane. There is a network of cane tramways to deliver the harvested sugarcane to the Mulgrave Sugar Mill in Gordonvale.

History

The town name is a corruption of the Yidinji word "Ngalumba", indicating hard milkwood tree (Alstonia Muellerana).

Aloomba Provisional School opened on 15 May 1899, becoming Aloomba State School on 1 January 1909.

On 20 April 1916, the Cane Beetles March commenced at Mooliba (now Mirriwinni). It was a snowball march to recruit men into the Australian Imperial Force during World War I at a time when enthusiasm to enlist had waned after the loss of life in the Gallipoli campaign. The march began at Mooliba with 4 men, passing through Babinda, Aloomba, Gordonvale, and Edmonton, and ending in Cairns 60 kilometers later with 29 recruits.

Education 

Aloomba State School is a government primary (Prep-6) school for boys and girls at Nielsen Street. In 2016, the school had an enrolment of 88 students with 7 teachers (6 full-time equivalent) and 8 non-teaching staff (3 full-time equivalent).  In 2018, the school had an enrolment of 91 students with 7 teachers (6 full-time equivalent) and 9 non-teaching staff (3 full-time equivalent).

Notable people 
 Bunny Adair, Member of the Queensland Legislative Assembly for Cook attended Aloomba State School

References

External links 

 

Populated places in Far North Queensland
Suburbs of Cairns
Localities in Queensland